Saerom Animation, Inc is an animation studio located in Seoul, South Korea which was founded in 1987 by Kil Whan Kim. While it mainly animates shows from American animation studios, the company has started making its own cartoons in 2003.

Productions

 Bugtime Adventures (alongside Starburst Animation)
 The Avengers
 Aladdin (uncredited) (alongside Sunwoo Entertainment) 
 Animaniacs (2020) (Seasons 2 and 3, alongside Digital eMation, Tiger Animation, Snipple Animation Studios and Yowza! Animation)
 Beetlejuice (uncredited) (alongside Hanho Heung-Up)
 Captain Planet (alongside Dong Woo Animation, Dong Yang Animation, Plus One Animation and Sei Young Animation)
 Cal and Rat (credited as Sae Rom Production Co. Ltd)
 Commander Cork: Space Ranger
 Darkwing Duck (uncredited) (alongside Hanho Heung-Up and Sunwoo Entertainment)
 Dora the Explorer
 Dora and Friends: Into the City! (alongside Snipple Animation Studios)
 Double Dragon (alongside Plus One Animation)
 Dragon Tales (uncredited) (alongside Dong Woo Animation, Rough Draft Korea, Wang Film Productions, Yeson Animation Studios, Sunwoo Entertainment, Siriol Productions, Lotto Animation, Koko Enterprises  and Yearim)
 FernGully: The Last Rainforest overseas ink/paint services (credited as Sae Rom Production Co. Ltd) (alongside Rough Draft Korea)
 Gadget Boy
 Gargoyles (alongside AKOM, Dong Yang Animation, Hanho Heung-Up, Koko Enterprises, Sunmin Image Pictures and Sunwoo Entertainment)
 Go, Diego, Go!
 Go! Cartoons
 Hey Arnold!: The Movie animation services (credited as Sae Rom Production Co. Ltd)
 Hey Arnold!: The Jungle Movie
 Johnny Bravo (Season 4, including the Christmas and Valentine's specials) (alongside Koko Enterprises, Rough Draft Korea and Sunwoo Entertainment)
 Madeline (alongside Plus One Animation)
 Marsupilami (alongside AKOM)
 Mixels: Nixel, Nixel, Go Away
 Monster Farm
 Mouse and the Monster
 NASCAR Superchargers
 Ni Hao, Kai-Lan (alongside Wang Film Productions)
 Oh Yeah! Cartoons (alongside Rough Draft Korea)
 Oswald (credited as Sae Rom Production Co. Ltd)
 Paranormal Roommates
 Party Wagon (in collaboration with Sunwoo Entertainment) 
 Phantom 2040 (alongside Sei Young Animation)
 The Pink Panther (1993) (alongside Wang Film Productions)
 Regular Show: The Movie
 Sam & Max: Freelance Police!!!
 Sandokan
 Scooby-Doo! Mystery Incorporated (Season 1 only, along with Lotto, Digital eMation and Dong Woo Animation)
 Sonic the Hedgehog (credited as Sae Rom Production Co. Ltd)
 Sonic Christmas Blast (credited as Sae Rom Production Co. Ltd)
 Stunt Dawgs
The Twisted Tales of Felix the Cat (alongside Plus One Animation)
Trap Universe (credited as Saerom)
Walter Melon
 What-a-Mess
 Young Robin Hood
 All-New Dennis the Menace (credited as Sae Rom Production Company, Ltd.)

Korean animation
Saerom also created these cartoons which were made for Korean audiences.

 Super Zuri: The Galactic Quest (a.k.a. Baby Zuri)
 Dreamy Pensee

See also

 Film Roman
 Klasky Csupo
 Boulder Media
 Titmouse, Inc.
 Sunwoo Entertainment
 Wang Film Productions
 Hong Ying Animation
 AKOM
 Mercury Filmworks
 Anivision
 Bardel Entertainment
 Rough Draft Studios
 Bento Box Entertainment

References

External links

Saerom
Entertainment companies of South Korea
Mass media companies established in 1987
South Korean companies established in 1987